GWJ or gwj may refer to:

 GWJ, the station code for Gongwang Street station, Hangzhou, China
 gwj, the ISO 639-3 code for Gǀui dialect, Botswana